A byway is a less-traveled side road, as in:
Byway (road), a minor secondary or tertiary road in the UK
National Scenic Byway, a road recognized by the United States Department of Transportation for its historical qualities

See also
Rights of way in England and Wales
Rights of way in Scotland